Laurie Mayer may refer to:

Laurie Mayer (composer) (born 1961), composer and musician
Laurie Mayer (newsreader) (born 1945), BBC newsreader

See also
Laurence Meyer (born 1944), economist